, the African country Rwanda ranks in the top five countries for gender equality according to the Global Gender Gap Report. The idea of fairness that dominates this country arose after the genocide against the Tutsi that occurred in 1994. The government is committed to ensuring equal rights for women and men without prejudice to the principles of gender equality and complementarity in national development.  These ideas are exhibited through the roles of Rwanda women in government, the respect for women's education and the role of women in Rwanda healthcare. The country also took an active stance against rape in genocide, created a national action plan after United Nations Resolution 1325, and is pushing towards ending gender-based violence.

Gender equality in the Rwandan government 
The Rwandan government is set up to have at least 61 percent of its parliament members be women. In an 80-member parliament, 46 members were female in 2003. Inside Rwanda's government, there is a Ministry of Gender and Family Promotion, a gender monitory office, and a commitment to gender-based budgeting that ensures the promotion of gender equality. The government supports programs like Women for Women International Rwanda, which focuses on women of the country becoming economically independent. The government also has promoted gender equality in Rwanda using the Ministry of Gender and Family Promotion. In one significant change, women have been given the same right as men to inherit land and in other factors like in some government posts, the military, and education.

Rape in genocide 

Rape was used throughout the Rwandan genocide by Hutu men to gain power and control over Tutsi women. This act was even encouraged by leaders as a weapon of war. The prominent Hutu Minister of Family and Women's Affairs for Rwanda, Pauline Nyiramasuhuko, emboldened Hutu men by distributing contraception for the purpose of rape. Nyiramasuhuko was quoted saying, "Before you kill the women, you need to rape them."

The United Nations speculates that about 250,000 to 500,000 women experienced rape during the genocide. These numbers may be modest when considering the stigma surrounding sexual violence within Rwanda. When Rwanda began to process the crimes committed during genocide, Rwandan law only categorized rape as a Category Four crime. This category is similar in severity to stealing property, not taking into account the severe trauma these women may be experiencing. Social worker Godeliève Mukasarasi realized this injustice and gathered rape survivors from genocide to testify their stories in Parliament. Mukasarasi's work allowed for members of Parliament to see the severity of rape in war and genocide. Rwandan legislators changed this act in genocide law from a Category Four to a Category One crime. Category One is equal to killing someone to perpetuate reasons of genocide. This legal affirmation of rape as a weapon in genocide solidifies the country's push towards gender equality.

Godelieve Mukasarasi also started a program called "SEVOTA" to help women and children impacted by rape and genocide processed through trauma. "SEVOTA" stands for Solidarity for the Blooming of the Widows and the Orphans aiming at Work and Self-promotion. Her program uses the arts and small group fellowship to help women and children share their experiences and break the stigma around sexual violence. This program also helps create relationships between children who were born from genocidal rape and their mothers. "SEVOTA" gives Rwandan women and survivors the tools to speak out about rape and sexual assault, with the aim to remove societal shame and bring empowerment.

United Nations Resolution 1325 in Rwanda 
The United Nations issued Resolution 1325 in 2000 to affirm their dedication to international gender equality. This document was crafted after the atrocities of the Rwandan genocide and focuses on how gender-based violence played a role in the conflict. Resolution 1325 specifically references how violence like genocide disproportionately hurts women and children. These women living in conflict-ridden states should also have a major role in stabilization efforts. The resolution details how women need to have an active voice in their respective governments, deserve defense from sexual assault and rape, need legal protections against gender-based attacks, and should be offered inclusivity in emergency aid programs. Most countries put Resolution 1325 into action through nation specific plans and commitments to end gender based violence. Rwanda specifically implemented Resolution 1325 in 2010 with an aim to end domestic violence and intimate partner violence. The national action plan also worked on relations between the genders after genocide and generating economic sustainability for women throughout the country. There is some skepticism on how Resolution 1325 actually impacts women living in areas that are not involved in high-profile politics. The measured success of the national action plan did not have tangible results specifically correlated to the resolution.

Educational advancements 
Rwanda has all pushed for girls education since the mass genocide. In 2004, The Girls’ Education Task Force (GETF) was created under the Ministry of Education to promote education for young girls. Programs have been created to help educate women who may have previously been kept out of school and allows them to receive the education they have been denied. These programs for equality in education are not for girls only though; programs have been implemented that allow both boys and girls to discuss women's education. The Aikiah Institute is the first all-female college in Rwanda and supports equality between genders by "preparing their students to be the future of the nation."

Gender equality in healthcare 
Rwanda has made many changes to promote equity for all, with one category that they have worked to improve in being healthcare. Malaria, HIV/AIDS and cholera were once prevalent in Rwanda. However, since the mass genocide that happened in 1994, Rwanda has been working to improve these conditions. The Rwandan government has partnered with Harvard's Public In Health and global health advocate; Paul Farmer. With this aid, the Rwandan government has completely re-standardized its health system. The promotion of health for women has been led by Rwanda health minister, Agnes Binagwaho. Binagwaho has pushed for equality in the healthcare system by advocating for young girls to receive the HPV vaccine Additionally, One UN Rwanda leads discussion groups on reproductive health and contraceptives to teach college women about health.

Ending gender-based violence 
Although Rwanda outlawed marital rape in 2009, there is still some work left to end gender-based violence in the country. As of 2015, 21 percent of women in Rwanda experienced physical and/or sexual intimate partner violence over the course of 12 months. This statistic is still a large improvement from when a vast number of women were raped during the genocide. Organizations like the Rwanda Women's Network have been created to help fight against domestic violence and gender-based violence.

A study done by BioMed Central analyzes the rates of intimate partner violence throughout Rwanda after the genocide, specifically in the years 2005 and 2010. In this case, intimate partner violence is defined as physical, emotional, mental, or sexual abuse within a partnered relationship. According to BioMed Central, 34 percent of Rwandan women claimed to have been in a partnered relationship and survived intimate partner violence in 2005. This number jumped to 56 percent in 2010. This increase could be attributed to the lessening of stigma in regards to intimate partner violence throughout Rwanda. Women are feeling more comfortable when sharing their experiences. Additionally, there was a sharp increase in female political leaders after the genocide in 2003, challenging strict gender roles throughout the country. BioMed Central also found that the rates of intimate partner violence could possibly have increased due to the visible amounts of powerful women in Rwandan society. Both of these theories indicate a slight shift in societal norms regarding gender based violence.

Another study conducted by departmental researchers at the University of Rwanda, Kigali, Umeå University, Sweden, and the University of Gothenburg, Sweden, investigated the stigma of intimate partner violence throughout Rwanda. The data shows that even though the state of Rwanda took an active stance against intimate partner violence, the societal standards for women were still in line with traditional gender roles. These varied standards impacted how women utilized resources when experiencing violence. This study also proves that to fully eradicate gender-based violence, change must come from Rwandan society as well as implemented policy.

Advancing gender equality 
Women in Rwanda have also been working to close the gender-based wage gap. In 2018, Rwandan women make eighty-eight cents to a man's dollar, which puts Rwanda as number 25 for economic equality among genders.

References

Rwanda
Women's rights in Rwanda
Human rights in Rwanda